Urbeliai is a village in Kėdainiai district municipality, in Kaunas County, in central Lithuania. According to the 2011 census, the village has a population of 5 people. It is located 1.5 km from Sirutiškis, by the regional road  Kėdainiai-Krekenava-Panevėžys, on the right bank of the Nevėžis river, next to its tributary Kruostas mouth. There was former hydroelectric power plant (now in ruins) on the Nevėžis near Urbeliai.

Demography

Images

References

Villages in Kaunas County
Kėdainiai District Municipality